Jack Gauldie (born 14 November 1942) is a Canadian water polo player. He competed in the men's tournament at the 1972 Summer Olympics.

References

1942 births
Living people
Canadian male water polo players
Olympic water polo players of Canada
Water polo players at the 1972 Summer Olympics
Sportspeople from Greenock